Tereza Smitková (born 10 October 1994) is a Czech tennis player.

Smitková has won one singles WTA 125 title as well as eight singles and seven doubles titles on the ITF Circuit. On 6 April 2015, she reached her best singles ranking of world No. 57. On 19 May 2014, she peaked at No. 184 in the WTA doubles rankings.

In June 2013, Smitková made her WTA Tour main-draw debut at the Nürnberger Versicherungscup. After coming through all three qualifying rounds, she lost to Julia Cohen in round one. A year later, she reached the third round of qualifying at the 2014 French Open, defeating 17th seed Victoria Duval in the first round and former top-20 player Anabel Medina Garrigues in the second. She lost in the third round of qualifying to fifth seed Danka Kovinić.

In the Wimbledon qualifying in June 2014, Smitková again reached the third round, this time defeating Madison Brengle in three sets to seal her maiden Grand Slam main-draw appearance. In the main draw, she defeated Hsieh Su-wei in the first round before upsetting grass-court specialist CoCo Vandeweghe, who was ranked world No. 51 and had won the Rosmalen Open the week before, in round two. In the third round, she defeated Bojana Jovanovski, in a match where Jovanovski served for the match twice and had held a match point on Smitková's serve. Her run was over in round four, after losing to fellow Czech Lucie Šafářová in straight sets.

Performance timelines

Only main-draw results in WTA Tour, Grand Slam tournaments, Fed Cup/Billie Jean King Cup and Olympic Games are included in win–loss records.

Singles
Current after the 2023 Dubai Championships.

Doubles
Current after the 2023 Australian Open.

WTA 125 tournament finals

Singles: 1 title

ITF Circuit finals

Singles: 15 (8 titles, 7 runner–ups)

Doubles: 14 (7 titles, 7 runner–ups)

Record against other players

Record against top 10 players 

 She has a 0–2 record against players who were, at the time the match was played, ranked in the top 10.

Notes

References

External links

 
 
 

1994 births
Living people
Sportspeople from Hradec Králové
Czech female tennis players
21st-century Czech women